The Tinglin–Fengjing Expressway, commonly referred to as the Tingfeng Expressway and designated S36, is a  in Shanghai, China. It runs from Jinshan District to the Shanghai-Zhejiang boundary.

History
It was formerly designated as A7.

Exit list

References

Expressways in Shanghai